Antonija is a Croatian, Latvian, Serbian and Slovene variant of the feminine given name Antonia.  Notable people with the name include:

Antonija Blaće (born 1979), Croatian television presenter
Antonija Nađ (born 1986), Serbian sprint canoeist
Antonija Panda (born 1977), Serbian sprint canoeist
Antonija Sandrić (born 1988), Croatian basketball player
Antonija Šola (born 1979), Croatian actress and singer

See also

Antonia (name)
Antonida Asonova
Antonije
Antonijo
Antonijs
Antonina (name)
Antoñita (disambiguation)
Antoniya

Notes

Croatian feminine given names
Latvian feminine given names
Serbian feminine given names
Slovene feminine given names